Farnham Creek is a stream in the U.S. state of Minnesota.

Farnham Creek was named for Summer W. Farnham, a businessperson in the lumber industry and state legislator.

See also
List of rivers of Minnesota

References

Rivers of Cass County, Minnesota
Rivers of Wadena County, Minnesota
Rivers of Minnesota